Sheila Helen McKay (born June 7, 1936) is a Canadian retired politician who served on the Edmonton City Council from 1989 to 1995.

Early life
McKay was born in Edmonton, Alberta. After graduating from Westglen High School, she went on to become a nurse, after attending the Misercordia Hospital School of Nursing. She has worked at the Misercordia Hospital in Edmonton in the emergency and intensive care wards.

Political career
After unsuccessful elections in 1974, 1977, 1980, and 1986, she was elected to Edmonton City Council in the 1989 Edmonton municipal election and re-elected again in the 1992 Edmonton municipal election. She would sit in a seat for Ward 6 until 1995, when she lost re-election. During her term, she became known for notoriously dumping a pitcher of water over the head of alderman Brian Mason during one heated dispute. She later blamed her actions in part on Mayor Jan Reimer's failure to censure Mason for telling her to "shut up". McKay was shortly thereafter ejected from the chamber. She also ran again, unsuccessfully in the 1998, 2007 and 2010 elections.

She is married to Murray McKay and has four children.

Man On The Moon Poem, Written 1986
Man on the moon has conqured outer space 

Typically dumped garbage to mark his place

When will Man "The Intelligent One" learn to take and replace as Nature has done?

Look at the junk in the gulliest kitchen 

Broken glass, crumpled cans, paper and plastic litter our lands

Pristine lakes and rivers are fewer

Many just a polluted sewer

Auschwitz/Hiroshima/Vietnam

Atrocities done in the name of Man

How can humanity survive

I only hope God is alive

White Man/Black Man/Yellow Man/Red

The Brotherhood of Man is dead

How can Humanity survive?

I only hope God is alive

A baby is born - rain falls, birds sing

We have survived for another spring

Only God must have the solution

To solve this Man made mess pollution

References

1936 births
Living people
Edmonton city councillors
Women municipal councillors in Canada